

Ginger Riley Munduwalawala (1936 – 1 September 2002) was an Aboriginal Australian contemporary artist. He was born incountry, in the Limmen Bight area of the Gulf of Carpentaria coast. His first language was Marra, now a critically endangered language. Riley became an artist during the 1950s as a result of his encounter with Albert Namatjira.

Riley was known for his distinctive style of using bright palette to paint a landscape of Gulf of Carpentaria, populated by mythological figures who created the region.  His art is a fusion of "Aboriginal" and "contemporary". He was referred to as "the boss of colour". 

Riley was awarded the National Aboriginal and Torres Strait Islander Art Award in 1987, the Northern Territory's Alice Prize in 1992,   John McCaughey Memorial Art Prize in 1993, the first National Aboriginal and Torres Strait Islander Heritage Art Award in 1993 and an Australia Council Fellowship for 1997/98.

The National Gallery of Victoria held a 10-year retrospective of his work in 1997. It was the first time a public institution in Australia honoured a living Aboriginal artist in this way.

See also
Australian art

References

Further reading

External links 
"Ginger Riley Munduwalawala: A Seeing Artist". Judith Ryan. Artlink
Munduwalawala at the Art Gallery of New South Wales

Australian Aboriginal artists
Year of birth uncertain
1937 births
2002 deaths
20th-century Australian painters